Kyrykivka is an urban-type settlement in Okhtyrka Raion of Sumy Oblast in Ukraine. It is located on the left bank of the Vorskla, a left tributary of the Dnieper. Kyrykivka hosts the administration of Kyrykivka settlement hromada, one of the hromadas of Ukraine. Population: 

Until 18 July 2020, Kyrykivka belonged to Velyka Pysarivka Raion. The raion was abolished in July 2020 as part of the administrative reform of Ukraine, which reduced the number of raions of Sumy Oblast to five. The area of Velyka Pysarivka Raion was merged into Okhtyrka Raion.

Economy

Transportation
Kyrykivka railway station is on the railway connecting Vorozhba with Kharkiv via Sumy. There is also a branch line to Okhtyrka. There is passenger traffic through the station.

The settlement is connected by road with Okhtyrka and Velyka Pysarivka, where it has further access to Kharkiv and Sumy.

References

Urban-type settlements in Okhtyrka Raion
Akhtyrsky Uyezd